Daniel "Big Dan" McNiven was a Scottish football center forward who led the American Soccer League in scoring in 1922-1923.

McNiven began his professional career in 1921 with Partick Thistle of the Scottish Football League. He played only five games before leaving Scotland for the United States. Upon reaching the U.S., he signed with Bethlehem Steel of the American Soccer League. He promptly made his mark, scoring twenty-eight goals in twenty-two league games, taking the league scoring title. He also added another four goals in three league cup games. In 1923, he began the season with New York Field Club, maintaining his scoring pace with eleven goals in nineteen league games and another goal in two league cup games. However, he finished the season with the New York Giants.  In 1924, he moved to Indiana Flooring, but his career ended seven games into the season when he was arrested on charges of bigamy and adultery. According to the charges, McNiven had married the wife of William Sheridan, the Bethlehem Steel coach in October 1923. In 1924, Sheridan's wife left the U.S. after having him served with divorce papers. At that point, he investigated her, discovering she had married McNiven a year prior and had McNiven arrested. That ended McNiven's football career.

References

Scottish footballers
Partick Thistle F.C. players
American Soccer League (1921–1933) players
Bethlehem Steel F.C. (1907–1930) players
New York F.C. players
New York Giants (soccer) players
Indiana Flooring players
Year of death missing
Place of death missing
Association football forwards
Scottish expatriate sportspeople in the United States
Expatriate soccer players in the United States
Scottish expatriate footballers
1902 births